The Hong Kong national football team represents Hong Kong in international football and is controlled by the Hong Kong Football Association, the governing body for football in Hong Kong. Hong Kong was the first in Asia to hold the AFC Asian Cup in 1956 and won third place, and was also semi-finalist in 1964. Hong Kong did not qualify for another AFC tournament until 2023. They had never qualified for the FIFA World Cup and its biggest celebrated victory was the 1986 FIFA World Cup qualification (AFC) where Hong Kong produced a 2–1 upset win against China which resulted in Hong Kong qualifying for the second rounds of qualification. Hong Kong has qualified for the EAFF E-1 Football Championship six times in 1995, 1998, 2003, 2010, 2019 and 2022.

History

Establishment and pre-WWII era
Before Hong Kong became a member of FIFA in 1954, Hong Kong began playing in the Hong Kong–Macau Interport tournament in 1937, which was one of the oldest competitions co-held by Hong Kong as well as continuously played. There were other interport tournaments in the past, such as the Shanghai-Hong Kong Interport which was first held in 1908. At that time the team was composed of ethnic Chinese as well as western expatriates, as in the 1935 and 1937 edition of Shanghai-Hong Kong Interport. There was another Interport tournament against Saigon. The aforementioned Macau, Shanghai and Saigon were not a member of FIFA nor a sovereign nation at that time, with Hong Kong and Macau only having joined FIFA in 1954 and 1978 respectively. The China national football team that participated in 1936 and 1948 Summer Olympics, were mainly composed of ethnic Chinese players from Hong Kong, most famously Lee Wai Tong.

After WWII, a number of Shanghai-based players began representing Hong Kong, such as Chang King Hai and Hsu King Shing. Hong Kong played its first international match after World War II in 1949, against South Korea. Its first victory came in 1953, a 4–0 win against South Korea.

FIFA member (1954–present)
the Hong Kong FA became a member of FIFA and the Asian Football Confederation since 1954. Since then Hong Kong played their first FIFA-recognized international match against other countries. HKFA also sent a scratch team for 1957 Merdeka Tournament, which was composed of players from Eastern due to their proximity, plus few players from other clubs. The club was having a pre-season tour in South Asia, thus the HKFA invited the club to represent Hong Kong. However, some of the players were in fact ineligible to play for Hong Kong, as they were ROC (Taiwan) international players.

Hong Kong qualified for three of the first four editions of the Asian Cup, including a third-place finish in the 1956 edition as host. At that time, most Hong Kong players represented Republic of China (Taiwan); they finished third in the Asian Cup in the 1960 edition, leaving more inferior players to the proper Hong Kong team.

Hong Kong has never qualified for the World Cup. However, its most celebrated victory happened during 1986 World Cup qualifying. On 19 May 1985, in Beijing, Hong Kong faced China in the final match of the first qualifying round, where Hong Kong needed a win to advance while China needed only a draw. Hong Kong, led by coach Kwok Ka Ming, produced a 2–1 upset win, with goals from Cheung Chi Tak and Ku Kam Fai, thereby winning the group and advancing to the knockout stage where it subsequently lost to Japan.

The 1998 World Cup Asian qualifiers was considered one of Hong Kong's darkest moments as it was hit by a match-fixing scandal that involved former Sing Tao attacker Chan Tsz-Kong who was found guilty and jailed for a year after he bribed players to throw and lose a match against Thailand. Others who were involved include goalkeeper Kevin Lok Kar-Win, defenders Chan Chi-Keung and Lau Chi Yuen and striker Wai Kwan-Lung.

Success at the 2009 East Asia Games and beyond
The year 2009 was a turning point in the diminishing football standards of Hong Kong. On 12 December, Hong Kong defeated Japan and took their first East Asian Games football gold medal, the first major competition Hong Kong have won. This result raised the belief that the Hong Kong football team could perform in major competition. The Hong Kong football team also won the 2010 Long Teng Cup and 2011 Long Teng Cup.

A short football fever appeared during 2018 World Cup qualifying in Hong Kong, as Hong Kong had drawn into the same group with their fierce rival, China. Due to the tensions built up from Hong Kong–Mainland China conflict, many local citizens became interested in this year's campaign; all four home matches were recorded as a sellout. Hong Kong ended the campaign with 4 victories against Bhutan and Maldives, 2 scoreless draws against China, and 2 losses against Qatar.

In late 2018, under the guidance of English-born coach Gary White, Hong Kong qualified for their third appearance at the E-1 EAFF East Asia Cup finals. Shortly afterwards, White departed from the role.
 
In April 2019, the Hong Kong Football Association appointed Finnish-born Mixu Paatelainen as the new head coach of the national football team in time for the 2022 World Cup qualifiers and the E-1 EAFF East Asia Cup finals. However, after a poor run of performances, Mixu's contract was not renewed.

On 13 December, Norwegian Jorn Andersen who formerly guided the North Korea national football team was named as the new head coach succeeding Mixu Paatelainen of the national football team in preparation for the third round of qualification of the 2023 Asian Cup finals.

Hong Kong qualified for the 2023 AFC Asian Cup by beating Afghanistan and Cambodia, reaching the final tournament after a 55-year absence.

Team image

Kits and crest
The national team's home kit has always been a red shirt, red shorts, and red or white socks. The away colours are white shirts, white shorts and red or white socks.

Kit suppliers

Kit deals

Crest
The crest of the Hong kong national football team has a Chinese dragon from the crest of the HKFA, which were logo has been always used as the team emblem. 

Nevertheless, the HKFA emblem was not used on jerseys until 31 May 2011, HKFA debuted current emblem for the national team.

Home Stadium

For some of the friendly matches and the minor qualification matches, the Hong Kong team plays most often at the Mong Kok Stadium in Kowloon, which was re-opened in 2011 after a renovation. Moreover, the 2018 edition of the Lunar New Year Cup was held in Mong Kok. The cup was a local tradition to celebrate Chinese New Year, which was held in Government Stadium in the past.

The Jockey Club HKFA Football Training Centre is currently the main training ground for the Hong Kong national and youth teams.

Rivalries

Hong Kong maintains a specific rivalry with China. The rivalry began in 1978 and for the first decades before the return of Hong Kong to China, Hong Kong produced a shock 2–1 upset in Beijing, and this led to unrest by Chinese supporters. Since then, China never lost to Hong Kong, and has achieved more successes, but the rivalry continues to have some influence on Hong Kong society.

Results and fixtures

2022

2023

2024

Coaching staff

Coaching history

Last updated: Hong Kong 0–0 Myanmar, 24 September 2022. Statistics include international "A" matches only.

Players

Current squad 
The following 23 players have been called up for friendly vs  held on 23 March 2023 and  held on 28 March 2023.

Caps and goals as of 24 September 2022 after the match against .

Recent call-ups 
The following players have been called up for the team within the previous 12 months.

PRE

PRE

PRE

PRE

PRE

PRE

PRE

PRE

 

 

PRE

PRE

PRE

PRE

PRE

PRE

PRE

 

PRE

PRE

PRE

 
 

 
PRE

INJ

INJ Player withdrew from the squad due to an injury
PRE Preliminary squad
WD  Player withdrawn from the squad.
RET Player retired from international football

Records

Players in bold are still active with Hong Kong.

Most appearances

Top goalscorers

Captains
Only record the players who were named as captains in official international competitions.

Competitive record
See comprehensive article: Hong Kong national football team – record in qualifying and major tournaments
Denotes draws includes knockout matches decided on penalty kicks.

All time results

FIFA World Cup

AFC Asian Cup

Asian Games 

† Excluding 1998 onwards

Dynasty Cup and East Asian Football Championship

Minor tournaments

Guangdong–Hong Kong Cup
Hong Kong team won the competition 17 times.

Lunar New Year Cup

References

Notes

Citations

External links

 Team news on the HKFA website
 Hong Kong Football – (English version)
 RSSSF Archive
 Results and list of matches on FIFA.com
 Information about Asia Soccer matches

 
Asian national association football teams
1939 establishments in Hong Kong